Mohamed Hassine Hatem Mersal (born 20 January 1975) is an Egyptian former long jumper.

His personal best jump is 8.31 metres, achieved in June 1999 in Oslo. This is the current national record.

Achievements

References

1975 births
Living people
Egyptian male long jumpers
Athletes (track and field) at the 2000 Summer Olympics
Olympic athletes of Egypt
African Games gold medalists for Egypt
African Games medalists in athletics (track and field)
Athletes (track and field) at the 1999 All-Africa Games
Athletes (track and field) at the 1997 Mediterranean Games
Mediterranean Games competitors for Egypt